Leucoma ochripes is a moth in the family Erebidae first described by Frederic Moore in 1879. It is found in Darjeeling in India, the north-east Himalayas, Yunnan in China, and Borneo.

The wingspan is 42 mm and it is pure white.

Biology
The larvae are polyphagous on dicotyledonous trees, known host plants are Sapium sp. (Euphorbiaceae), Litsea glutinosa and Phoebe sp. (Lauraceae).

References

Lymantriinae
Moths described in 1879